Salem Tutt Whitney ( Salem Tutt; 15 November 1875 – 12 February 1934) and J. Homer Tutt ( Jacob Homer Tutt; 31 January 1882 – 10 February 1951), known collectively as the Tutt Brothers, were American vaudeville producers, writers, and performers of the late 19th and early 20th century. They were also known as Whitney & Tutt, Tutt & Whitney and the Whitney Brothers. They were prominent in black vaudeville and created over forty revues for black audiences.

Biography
Salem Tutt Whitney was born in Logansport, Indiana (birth-year varies: 1869, 1875, 1876, or 1878), as was his brother J. Homer Tutt. They referred to themselves as brothers, and may have been half-brothers. Whitney originally intended to become a minister but later decided to become a performer, and left college. He attended the National School of Journalism and gained amateur experience in acting, comedy and writing.

From 1888 through 1905, the brothers performed in their traveling tent show called Silas Green from New Orleans. The show, which ran until the 1940s, was bought by circus owner Eph Williams although the brothers never received payment. 

They formed the Smart Set Company in the 1910s, possibly taken over from Sherman H. Dudley. From 1910 to 1925 Whitney and Tutt  produced more than 40 revues for black performers and audiences, writing and performing in the shows themselves. Some of their performers found fame in their own right, including blues singer Mamie Smith, who danced in the brothers' Smart Set as a teenager.

One of the Brothers' main productions was a musical farce called George Washington Bullion. Starring Whitney as a tobacco plantation owner, it was popular with audiences and ran for two decades. Their musical Oh Joy! played on Broadway for four weeks. It had originally starred Ethel Waters when performed in Boston. But when the only theatre space the Brothers could find in New York City was on a tennis court under a tent, Waters pulled out and was replaced by Ethel Williams. Both of the brothers performed in Marc Connelly's play The Green Pastures (1930). 

They also acted in films, spanning both silent films and talkies, including Birthright (1924), directed by Oscar Micheaux and adapted from a novel of the same name by T. S. Stribling; Marcus Garland (1925), The Broken Violin (1927), and A Daughter of the Congo (1930). 

Salem Tutt Whitney died in Chicago, February 12, 1934, and J. Homer Tutt died in Los Angeles, February 10, 1951.

Works

 Silas Green from New Orleans (ca. 1903-ca. 1953)
 Prince Bungaloo (1908)
 Blackville Strollers (1908-1909)
 The Mayor of Newtown (1909)
 George Washington Bullion (1910)
 "Love Me Anywhere"
 "Manyanna" ("Land of To-morrow")
 "Old Kentucky Blues"
 "Dear Old Southern Moon"
 The Wrong Mr. President (1913)
 His Excellency, the President (1914)
 George Washington Bullion Abroad (1915)
 How Newtown Prepared (1916)
 My People (1917)
 Darkest Americans (1918-1919)
 (The) Children of the Sun (1919-1920)
 Betwixt and Between (1920s)
 Bamboula (1921)
 Small Town Doings (1921)
 Up and Down (1922)
 Jump Steady (1922)
 Oh Joy! (1922)
 North Ain't South (1923)
 Come Along Mandy (1923-1924)
 Who Struck John? (1923-1924)
 Hide and Seek (1924)
 Non-Sense (1925)
 When Malinda Sings (1925)
 Rainbow Chasers (1926)
 Deep Harlem (1929)
 The Witching Eyes (1929) directed by Ernest Stern

Family 
Salem Tutt Whitney was married three times, his first to Emma A. Baynard (1872–1908) (her second marriage). They married May 6, 1903, in Philadelphia at Crucifixion Episcopal Church – Rev. Henry Laird Phillips (1848–1947), officiating. Rev. Phillips, in 1877, became the first African-American rector of the Crucifixion Church in 1877. Baynard was a sister of William Andrew Baynard, a pianist, who, with Salem and Emma, had, in 1900, performed with the Oriental Troubadours. Emma was a soporano and prima donna with  the Troubadours. She previously, on March 17, 1897, in Williamstown, Pennsylvania, married Lewis E. Puggsley (1858–1935), an operatic tenor soloist, with whom she had a son, Baynard Lewis Puggsley (1898–1956). Lewis Puggsley was a brother of Charles Henry Puggsley (1868–1932), who, in 1900, was second tenor and soloist with the Oriental Troubadours.

Copyrights

Copyrights 

 
 
 
 
 
 

 2 c. indicates two copies received, followed by the date.

Bibliography

Annotations

Notes

References 
News media

 

 
 

 

 

 
 

Books, journals, magazines, and papers

 . . ; and 

 . .

 . .

 . . .
 . . .
 . . .
 . . .

 

 
 Collier-Macmillan (1968). .
 Macmillan (1971). .
 Schirmer (1979). . .
 Da Capo Press (paperback) (1994). . . .
(page nos. correspond to the Da Capo edition, accessible via Archive.org – link)
 "J. Homer Tutt". pp. 152, 255.
 "Salem Tutt-Whitney". pp. 76, 152, 156, 255.

External links

Sibling duos
Vaudeville performers
Vaudeville producers
People from Logansport, Indiana
African-American actors
Shortridge High School alumni
Actors from Indianapolis